Abdulrahman Obaid Al-Youbi is the president of King Abdulaziz University from June 2016 to October 2022.

Biography

Al-Youbi received his Bachelor’s and Master’s degree in Chemistry from King Abdulaziz University. He attended the University of Essex on a scholarship, where he received his PhD in Physical Chemistry in 1986.

Before being appointed as President of King Abdulaziz University in 2016, he served as Vice President. He was a consultant at the Ministry of Higher Education, and was Dean and Vice-dean of the Faculty of Science, King Abdulaziz University.

References 

1958 births
Living people
Saudi Arabian chemists
King Abdulaziz University alumni
Academic staff of King Abdulaziz University
Alumni of the University of Essex
Heads of universities and colleges in Saudi Arabia
Physical chemists